David Palmer (born 7 April 1965) also known as Yorkie was born in Clitheroe, Lancashire, England. He is a British musician who was a member of the Liverpool-based band Space from 1997 to 2005.

Yorkie is the son of Gladys Palmer, a Liverpool-based singer who owned several rehearsal rooms for bands in Liverpool. Yorkie begin his music career as a member of post-punk band The Dance Party alongside Michael Head, who would later go on to form The Pale Fountains and Shack. Yorkie would go on to form his own band The Balcony.

Production credits 
On the Corner of Miles and Gil (2006) by Liverpool's Shack
Cells (2007) by Kendal's Seven Seals
matty palmer bro
Avenged Sevenfold - David Palmer

References

External links 
 
 International Who's Who in Popular Music on Google Books
 Interview by Incendiary Magazine

1965 births
Living people
People from Clitheroe
British alternative rock musicians
Musicians from Liverpool